HMS Brecon was a  destroyer of the Royal Navy that saw service in the Second World War, one of two ships in the fourth subgroup of the class, built to a radically different design from other ships in the Hunt class.

Construction and commissioning
Brecon was ordered under the 1940 War Emergency Programme from Thornycroft of Woolston. She was laid down as Job J6069 (Yard No 1290) on 27 February 1941 and launched on 27 June 1942 . She was commissioned into service on 18 December 1942 and was assigned to the 6th Destroyer Flotilla at Scapa Flow.

Career

1943

Brecon arrived at the Home Fleet at Scapa Flow in January 1943 and after working up was engaged in convoy escort and Fleet duties in the North Western Approaches and North Sea. In June she was detached from Home Fleet to be made ready for service in Mediterranean to support Operation Husky, the planned allied landings in Sicily. She was one of the escorts for joint military convoy WS31 and KMF17 to Gibraltar and continued with KMF17. In July she helped escort the assaulting forces in convoy KMF18 to the beach head where she remained to provide convoy defence and interception patrols.

In August Brecon was transferred to Destroyer Division 58 and assigned to Task Force 85 for Operation Avalanche, the allied landings at Salerno. For the remainder of the year she engaged in duties in the central and western Mediterranean.

1944

In January she provided support for Operation Shingle, the allied landings at Anzio. She arrived at the beachhead on 23 January where she provided support and patrol duties which continued through February and March. With ,  and  she took part in the sinking of the German submarine . In April she was transferred to 18th Destroyer Flotilla for further convoy escort and patrol duties.

In July Brecon started preparations under the command of the  United States Navy for Operation Dragoon, the invasion of southern France. In August she escorted convoy SM3 to the beachhead and then was returned to Royal Navy command for patrol and convoy defence in the eastern Mediterranean. On 28 September she bombarded German forces at Pegadio and Karpathos. In October, with the withdrawal of German troops from the Aegean Islands and Greek mainland she joined the British Aegean Force to intercept German evacuation craft and provided gunfire support for landing allied troops. In December she returned to the UK to prepare for service in East Indies.

1945
On arrival in the UK Brecon was instead assigned to the 21st Destroyer Flotilla based at Sheerness to combat snorkel fitted U-boats that were attacking convoys and minelaying in the South Western Approaches.  In April she sailed to Malta to refit for service in the Eastern Fleet, before returning to the UK for leave.  In June she joined the 18th Destroyer Flotilla at Colombo and started preparations for Operation Zipper, the planned British re-occupation of Malaya. During August she performed escort duties, before sailing to Singapore in September to attend the surrender of the Japanese occupying forces. Brecon returned to Portsmouth on 12 December 1945 to be paid-off and was placed into Reserve status.

Postwar & fate
Brecon remained in Reserve until 1956 when placed on the Disposal List.  Her hulk was sold to BISCO for breaking in August 1961. She was towed to Faslane in September 1962 for demolition by Shipbreaking Industries Ltd.

References

Publications
 
 English, John (1987). The Hunts: a history of the design, development and careers of the 86 destroyers of this class built for the Royal and Allied Navies during World War II. England: World Ship Society. .

External links
 HMS Brecon at naval-history.net

 

Hunt-class destroyers of the Royal Navy
1942 ships
World War II destroyers of the United Kingdom
Ships built by John I. Thornycroft & Company